Wrestling was one of the sports which was held at the 1966 Asian Games in Bangkok, Thailand between 10 and 13 December 1966. The competition included only men's freestyle events.

Medalists

Medal table

References
 Freestyle result
 Archived freestyle result
 The Straits Times, 15 December 1966, Page 22

External links
UWW Database

 
1966 Asian Games events
1966
Asian Games
1966 Asian Games